Dong Chunhua (born 4 August 1990 in China) is a Chinese baseball catcher for the Shanghai Eagles. He was a member of the China national baseball team in the 2009 World Baseball Classic.

References

1990 births
Living people
Chinese baseball players
2009 World Baseball Classic players
Baseball players from Shanghai
21st-century Chinese people